The Gospel of Saint Nicholas is a Serbian illuminated manuscript written on parchment in 13th from the Monastery of St. Nicholas of Rošci, with size of 16x10.5 cm, 144 pages and 17 editions of text on each of the pages decorated with illuminations, initials and flags, gold and silver details. According to the historian Pavel Šafarik (1858), this Gospel he calls it "The Gospel of Queen Jelena", was written for Helen of Anjou, between 1240 and 1250.

Written in Serbian-Slavonic, with elements of the vernacular. The Gospel of St. Nicholas was once owned by the Serbian Orthodox monastery near Ovčar Banja, and today it is kept in Ireland.

Manuscript 
The manuscript is dedicated to the Matthew the Apostle, Mark the Evangelist, Luke the Evangelist and John the Apostle together with him, an illustration of the trademark of one of the evangelists - Matthew as angel, Mark as a winged lion, Luke as winged ox and an John as eagle. The letter in which the Gospel was written in Serbian Cyrillic constitutional alphabet, and the spelling of verb books which was present in Serbian literature in 13th century.

History 
From the time of its creation until today, this monument of Serbian cultural heritage has come a long and mysterious way. In 1820, Vuk Karadžić found it in Monastery Nikolje Kablarsko 1854, and Aleksa Vukomanović took it from the same in 1864, the gospel continued his life in National Library of Serbia, getting his number in the library catalog and a place on its shelves. Đuro Daničić published the book Nikoljsko jevanđelje in the state printing house in Belgrade in 1864, which he dedicated to the Serbian prince Mihailo Obrenović.

Until 1914 the Gospel was kept in the National Library, but in the World War I every trace of it was lost. During the evacuation in July 1914, from the collection of rarities of the National Library, 56 most precious and valuable manuscripts and printed books, including the Gospel of St. Nicholas were singled out, placed in wooden boxes and sent by a train to Kosovska Mitrovica far from the front lines. On that journey, at the railway station, every trace of the boxes we lost. The situation in Serbia since that period was more than unfavorable, followed by World War II during which the invaluable cultural treasure of the Serbian people went into irretrievability.

It took until 1964 for it to become known that a part of the lost Serbian cultural heritage treasure, including the St. Nicholas Gospel, was kept in the library of the private collector Sir Chester Beatty in Dublin. Seeking an opinion on some Slavonic manuscripts that were in this famous library, the London slavicist John Denton A. Barnicot turned to the archaeologist , the head of the Archaeological Department of the National Library of Serbia, for help. After reviewing the recordings of the texts sent to him by Barnicot, Mošin concludes that the manuscripts in question, which were kept in the National Library of Serbia until the First World War, disappeared a long time ago. It was, in fact, about three Serbian medieval books: Nikoljsko jevanđelje (late 14th – early 15th century), Serbian four gospels (late 13th – early 14th century) and Praznični Minej of Božidar Vuković, printed on parchment in 1537. How these books, lost in the whirlwind of war, reached Sir Chester Beatty's library in Ireland is not entirely known.

Today 
After his death, according to his will, Sir Chester Beatty handed over his collection to the Republic of Ireland and it is now kept in the Chester Beatty Library. Vladimir Davidović received a copy of the St. Nicholas Gospel, which was printed in a hundred luxury copies, accompanied by a reprint of the Daničić's book. Copies of this book were sent to the most important libraries in the world and in Serbia.

Images

References

Bibliography 

 Bibliografija o Nikoljskom jevanđelju at the Faculty of Philosophy, University of Novi Sad

Serbian manuscripts
Manuscripts in the Chester Beatty Library
13th-century manuscripts